Beatty Road station is a SEPTA Route 101 trolley stop in Media, Pennsylvania. It is officially located on Beatty Road and Surrey Road, although the intersection of Beatty Road and Court House Road is much closer.

Trolleys arriving at this station travel between 69th Street Terminal in Upper Darby, Pennsylvania and Orange Street in Downtown Media. The station has an open acrylic glass bus-stop like shed on the southeast corner of the railroad crossing. While no parking is officially available at this station, a parking lot across from the intersection of Beatty & Court House Roads exists for a shopping center along Baltimore Pike between North Providence and Beatty Roads. Beatty Road is the westernmost station on the Route 101 line that contains two tracks.

Station layout

External links

 Station from Beatty Road from Google Maps Street View

SEPTA Media–Sharon Hill Line stations